Neelaps bimaculatus, also known as the black-naped snake, western black-naped snake or black-naped burrowing snake, is a species of burrowing venomous snake  endemic to Australia. The specific epithet bimaculatus (“two-spotted”) refers to the distinctive black patches on head and nape.

Description
The species grows to an average of about 40 cm in length.

Behaviour
The species is oviparous, with an average clutch size of four.

Distribution and habitat
The species occurs in South Australia and Western Australia.

References

 
bimaculatus
Snakes of Australia
Endemic fauna of Australia
Reptiles of South Australia
Reptiles of Western Australia
Taxa named by Gabriel Bibron
Reptiles described in 1854
Taxa named by André Marie Constant Duméril
Taxa named by Auguste Duméril